Seongnyongsan is a mountain in South Korea. Its area extends across the city of Pocheon, Gyeonggi-do and Hwacheon County, Gangwon-do.

See also
 List of mountains in Korea

Notes

References
 

Mountains of South Korea
Mountains of Gangwon Province, South Korea
Mountains of Gyeonggi Province